Omniview technology (also known as surround view or bird view) is a vehicle parking assistant technology that first was introduced in 2007 as the "Around View Monitor" option for the Nissan Elgrand and Infiniti EX. It is designed to assist drivers in monitoring their surroundings, for example, while parking a vehicle in a small space.

Principle
Early vehicle parking assistant products used ultrasonic parking sensors and/or a single rear-view camera to view and obtain distances to objects surrounding the vehicle, providing drivers with an audible alarm or rear-view video through a fisheye lens. There are some drawbacks to these early products: the alarm only provides a proximity warning but not the position of the object(s) relative to the vehicle, and the rear-view camera has a limited field of view. However, omniview technology overcomes these problems and has seen increasing availability.

In most omniview systems, there are four wide-angle cameras: one in the front of the vehicle, one in the back of the vehicle, and one each in the side-mounted rear view mirrors. The four cameras have overlapping fields of view that collectively cover the whole area around the vehicle and serve as an omnidirectional (360-degree) camera. Video from the cameras are sent to the processor, which synthesizes a bird's-eye view from above the vehicle by stitching the video feeds together, correcting distortion, and transforming the perspective. In some cases, ultrasonic sensors are used in combination with the omniview system to provide distance information and highlight the relevant view that may be affected by potential obstacles.

Because the bird's-eye view is a simulated perspective using camera inputs much closer to the ground, objects at ground level will appear relatively undistorted while those above the ground will appear to "lean away" from the vehicle. In addition, if the same object is captured by the overlapping fields of two cameras, it can appear to lean away in two different directions.

History
The first vehicle equipped with Nissan's "Around View Monitor" was the Japanese-market Elgrand, introduced in November 2007. In America, the system was introduced one month later, as an option for the EX35 from Nissan's luxury marque Infiniti. At about the same time, Mitsubishi Motors and Honda implemented similar functionality as the "Multi-around monitor system" for the Delica and "Multi-View Camera System" for the Odyssey, respectively.

Third-party automotive component suppliers such as Freescale Semiconductor and Continental AG have developed and marketed modular omniview systems, the latter through the acquisition of Application Solutions Ltd. (ASL Vision).

Nissan have since added moving object detection using the cameras, billing the system as "Intelligent Around View Monitor" (I-AVM). In 2016, stuntman Paul Swift used the I-AVM system to match the world record for the tightest J-turn in a specially-prepared Nissan Juke, using a space just  wider than the vehicle's length to turn it around with the windows completely blacked out.

An omniview system that uses four cameras and displays a three-dimensional rendering of the vehicle and its surroundings has been proposed as a logical next step to increase the driver's awareness.

See also 

 Advanced driver-assistance systems
 Automatic parking
 Backup collision
 Backup camera
 Blind spot monitor
 Car safety
 Concave mirror
 Convex mirror
 Dry steering
 Experimental Safety Vehicle (ESV)
 Fresnel lens
 Intelligent Parking Assist System
 Intelligent car
 Lane departure warning system
 Laser rangefinder
 Objects in mirror are closer than they appear
 Parking
 Parking sensors
 Pininfarina vertical A-pillar Ferrari P4/5
 Precrash system
 Rear-view mirror
 Side-view mirror
 Sonar
 Volvo SCC
 Wing mirror

References

External links 
Omniview suppliers
 Mobileye Israel 
 Fujitsu Japan
 Percherry China

Auto parts
Vehicle safety technologies
Automotive technologies
Information technology
Automotive engineering
Parking